OFK Kikinda is a football club based in Kikinda, Vojvodina, Serbia. They compete in the Vojvodina League East, the fourth tier of the national league system.

History
The first club in the town was founded in August 1909 as Nagykikindai Atlétikai Klub (NAK), competing within the Hungarian football league system. They stopped their activities during World War I. Later on, the club was reactivated as Kikindski atletski klub (KAK), before changing its name to AK Srbija.

Following World War II, the club became known as 6. oktobar. They qualified for the Serbian League, the third tier of Yugoslav football, in 1947. The club would also reach the Yugoslav Cup round of 16 in 1949, losing 7–3 to Hajduk Split.

During the early 1950s, the club changed its name twice, first to Trgovački and then to Banat. They would finish as champions of the Banat League in 1959 to earn promotion to the Vojvodina League. In 1961, the club merged with local rivals Radnički to form FK Odred. They subsequently won the Vojvodina League in the 1961–62 season, but lost in the promotion playoffs for the Yugoslav Second League. Over the next six seasons, the club played in the newly formed Serbian League North.

After the reestablishment of the Vojvodina League as the third tier in 1968, the club spent the next two seasons in the competition. They would suffer relegation to the Banat League in 1970. In 1971, the club changed its name to OFK Kikinda. They returned to the Vojvodina League in 1973. The club managed to win the title in 1976 and gained promotion to the Yugoslav Second League. They placed third in Group West in their debut appearance in the second tier.

In the 1979–80 season, the club made one of its biggest achievements by reaching the semi-finals of the Yugoslav Cup, before losing 3–1 to the eventual winners Dinamo Zagreb. They also suffered relegation from the Second League that year, but secured an instant promotion back as Vojvodina League champions in 1980–81. Over the next 11 seasons, the club competed in the second tier of Yugoslav football.

After the breakup of Yugoslavia, the club was promoted to the newly created First League of FR Yugoslavia. They spent two seasons in the top flight before suffering relegation in 1993–94. The club finished as runners-up in the 1995–96 Second League of FR Yugoslavia and returned to the First League for one more season.

From 1997 to 2000, the club played in the Second League of FR Yugoslavia, before suffering relegation to the Serbian League Vojvodina. They spent the next six seasons in the third tier of football in Serbia and Montenegro. The club won the Vojvodina League East in 2007–08 and took promotion to the third tier of Serbian football.

Celebrating its 100th anniversary in August 2009, the club changed its name back to OFK Kikinda. They were relegated to the fourth tier in 2012 and eventually to the fifth tier in 2015.

Honours
Vojvodina League (Tier 3)
 1975–76, 1980–81
Vojvodina League East (Tier 4)
 2007–08, 2020–21

Notable players
This is a list of players who have played at full international level.
  Predrag Bošnjak
  Dimitrije Injac
  Mladen Krstajić
  Dragan Žilić
  Blagoje Paunović
  Božidar Sandić
For a list of all OFK Kikinda players with a Wikipedia article, see :Category:OFK Kikinda players.

Managerial history

References

External links
 Club page at Srbijasport

1909 establishments in Serbia
Association football clubs established in 1909
Football clubs in Yugoslavia
Football clubs in Serbia
Football clubs in Vojvodina
Sport in Kikinda